Corythucha tuthilli is a little-known species of lace bug Tingidae native to Colorado and Arizona.

C. tuthilli was first described from Mineral County, Colorado in the southern Rocky Mountains. It was recently found again on woolly cinquefoil (Potentilla hippiana Lehm.; Rosaceae.

References

Tingidae
Insects described in 1940
Endemic fauna of Colorado